Murder, She Baked is an American/Canadian television film series, based on the cozy mystery novels written by Joanne Fluke. The television films centered around small-town baker Hannah Swensen, portrayed by Alison Sweeney, and Detective Mike Kingston, played by Cameron Mathison. Five films for the Hallmark Movies & Mysteries channel were created based on Fluke's book series, with the fifth movie airing on March 26, 2017. The films took a four year hiatus before returning as the Hannah Swensen Mysteries. The films are set in the fictional town of Eden Lake in Minnesota, reverting to Lake Eden like in the novels in the sixth film.

Cast
Alison Sweeney as Hannah Swensen, a local baker who owns the Cookie Jar bakery and cafe
Cameron Mathison as Detective Mike Kingston, a recently widowed homicide detective who moves to town from the city
Lisa Durupt as Andrea Todd, Hannah's sister
 Toby Levins as Deputy Bill Todd, a local detective who is married to Andrea
Gabriel Hogan as Doctor Norman Rhodes, a dentist and Hannah's close friend
Barbara Niven as Delores Swensen, Hannah, Andrea and Michelle's mother
Juliana Wimbles as Lisa Herman, a helper at Hannah's bakery
Garry Chalk as Mayor Bascomb, the town's Mayor
Tess Atkins as Michelle Swensen, youngest daughter of Delores

Characters

 A dark grey cell indicates the character was not in the film.

Film series
<onlyinclude>

References

External links
 
 
 
 
 
 

Hallmark Channel original programming
Hallmark Channel original films
2015 television films
2016 television films
2017 television films
American film series
American mystery films
Canadian film series
Canadian television films
Canadian mystery films
Films based on American novels
Films shot in British Columbia
2010s Canadian films